This article discusses the phonological system of the Czech language.

Consonants

Consonant chart
The following chart shows a complete list of the consonant phonemes of Czech:

Phonetic notes:
 Sibilants  are laminal post-alveolars (usually not considered retroflex). 
 The approximant  is mainly pronounced apico-alveolar, although a velarized pronunciation without a firm tongue tip contact is not unusual. 
 The phoneme , written , is a raised alveolar non-sonorant trill. The basic realization of this phoneme is voiced, but it is voiceless  when preceded or followed by a voiceless consonant or at the end of a word. Phonetically, the sound  is a period of friction interrupted at the beginning by a contact or contacts created by a retracted apico-alveolar gesture. 
 Sonorants ,  become syllabic between two consonants or after a consonant at the end of a word.
  and  can be pronounced as dental stops. While  is commonly  realized as apico-alveolar,  is more likely to be laminal denti-alveolar.
  is alveolo-palatal nasal. 
 The voiceless realization of the phoneme  is velar .

Glottal stop
The glottal stop is not a separate phoneme. Its use is optional and it may appear as the onset of an otherwise vowel-initial syllable. The pronunciation with or without the glottal stop does not affect the meaning and is not distinctive.

The glottal stop has two functions in Czech:
 The emphasis on the boundaries between words or in compound words is usually inserted between two vowels which do not form a diphthong, e.g.   ('to use'),   ('dad and mum'); it separates prepositions from words beginning with a vowel, e.g.   ('out of the window'); it is also inserted before initial vowels of the second part of compound words, e.g.   ('triangle'). This usage of the glottal stop is usual in Bohemia. Pronunciation without it is typical of Moravian regions, e.g. , . Both variants are regarded as correct.
 Certain words can be emphasized by the use of the glottal stop.

In the standard pronunciation, the glottal stop is never inserted between two vowels in words of foreign origin, e.g. in the word .

Marginal consonant phonemes
As for /f/, however, the number of words where it occurs is still significant and many of them are commonplace, e.g. fialový ('violet'), fronta ('queue' as a noun), fotit ('take photos'), doufat ('hope' as a verb). It is also used in common first names (František, Filip) and surnames (Fiala, Fišer). The phoneme /g/, though rarer than /f/, appears in frequently used words as well, e.g. graf ('graph'), gram ('gram'), grep ('grapefruit'), regulace ('regulation'). The phoneme  is quite marginal, used mostly by dialects spoken near the border with Slovakia (see Slovak phonology).

Nevertheless, as phonemic realizations [f], [g],  and  all four consonants also occur as allophones of /v/, /k/, /t͡ʃ/ and /t͡s/ respectively due to assimilation of voice. Moreover, affricates can phonetically occur at morpheme boundaries (see consonant merging below).

Consonants in the script
Other consonants are represented by the same characters (letters) as in the IPA.

Consonant assimilation
Realizations of consonant phonemes are influenced by their surroundings. The position of phonemes in words can modify their phonetic realizations without a change of the meaning.

Assimilation of the place of articulation

The former assimilation is optional while the latter is obligatory.

Assimilation of voice
Assimilation of voice is an important feature of Czech pronunciation. Voiced obstruents are, in certain circumstances, realized voiceless and vice versa. It is not represented in orthography, where more etymological principles are applied. Assimilation of voice applies in these circumstances:
 In consonant groups – all obstruents in the group are realized either voiced or voiceless. It is mostly governed by the last consonant in the group (regressive assimilation), e.g.   ('solution').
 Voiced obstruents are realized voiceless in the pre-pausal position (final devoicing). Compare   ('ice') –   ('ice' gen.) vs.   ('flight') –   ('flight' gen.) – the nominative forms of both words ( – ) are pronounced the same due to final devoicing in the first; but in the other inflection forms their pronunciation differs.

Voiced and voiceless obstruents form pairs in which the assimilation of voice applies (see table):

Sonorants (and ) have no voiceless counterparts and are never devoiced. They do not cause the voicing of voiceless consonants in standard pronunciation, e.g.   ('to watch').

There are some exceptions to the rules described above:
 The phoneme  also does not cause the voicing of preceding voiceless consonants (that is, it acts as a sonorant before vowels), e.g.   ('light'). However,  followed by a voiceless consonant is also realized voiceless, e.g.   ('to bet').
('a throw') –   ('a throw' gen.). ('so that I would...'). The phoneme  undergoes progressive assimilation after /s/ in Bohemian pronunciation, e.g. ('goodbye'), whereas standard regressive assimilations are typical of Moravian pronunciation, .
 The phoneme  does not cause assimilations of adjacent consonants, but it undergoes progressive as well as regressive assimilation according to its surroundings, e.g.   ('by'). Its basic realization is voiced. In final position, it is voiceless.

Consonant merging
Two identical consonant phonemes (or allophones) can meet in morpheme boundaries during word formation. In many cases, especially in suffixes, two identical consonant sounds merge into one sound in pronunciation, e.g.   ('valuable'),   ('soft').

In prefixes and composite words, lengthened or doubled pronunciation (gemination) is obvious. It is necessary in cases of different words:   ('the clearest') vs.   ('more unclear').

Combinations of stops and fricatives usually produce affricates:   ("children's"). Both phonemes are pronounced separately in careful pronunciation: .

Vowels
There are 10 monophthongal and 3 diphthongal vowel phonemes in Czech: . Czech is a quantity language: it differentiates five vowel qualities that occur as both phonologically short and long. The short and long counterparts generally do not differ in their quality, although long vowels may be more peripheral than short vowels.

As for the high front vowel pair , there are dialectal differences with respect to phonetic realisation of the contrast: in the Bohemian variety of Czech, the two vowels are differentiated by both quality and duration, while in the Eastern Moravian variety of Czech the primary difference is that of duration. Therefore, in the Bohemian variety, the transcription  more accurately reflects the tradeoff between the qualitative and the durational difference in these vowels, while in the Eastern Moravian variety of Czech, the transcription  captures the primary durational difference.

Besides length, Czech differentiates three degrees of height and three degrees of backness.

Vowel length and quality is independent of the stress.

Short vowels 

 is spelled  and 
 is spelled  and 
 is spelled 
 is spelled 
 is spelled

Long vowels 

Long vowels are indicated by an acute accent or a ring.

 is spelled  and 
 is spelled 
 is spelled 
 is spelled  (this phoneme occurs almost exclusively in words of foreign origin)

Diphthongs 
 is spelled  (occurs almost exclusively in words of foreign origin)
 is spelled  (occurs in words of foreign origin only)
 is spelled 

This transcription describes the pronunciation in Central Bohemia and Prague, which is more open.

The letter  is not a separate vowel. It denotes  after a palatal stop or palatal nasal (e.g.  ),  after /m/ (e.g.  ), and  after other labial consonants (e.g.  ).

They are pronounced with an epenthetic  between the vowels: .

Prosody

Stress 
The stress is nearly always fixed to the first syllable of a word. Exceptions:
 One-syllable prepositions usually form a unit with following words. Therefore, the stress moves to the prepositions, ˈ ('Prague') → ˈ ('to Prague'). This rule is not always applied in words which have four or more syllables: e.g. either ˈ ˌ or  ˈˌ ('on the colonnade') are possible.
 Some one-syllable words (e.g.  ('me'),  ('you'),  ('it'),  ('oneself'),  ('am'),  ('are'), etc.) are clitics — they are not stressed and form a unit with preceding words, therefore they cannot be the first words in (standard) sentences. Example: ˈ ˈ ('I have written the letter to you'). (See Czech word order for details.)

Long words can have the secondary stress which is mostly placed on every odd syllable, e.g. ˈ.ˌ ('the most beautiful'). However, in some cases it can be placed on the fourth syllable, e.g. ˈ.ˌ ('the greenest').

The stress has no lexical or phonological function; it denotes boundaries between words but does not distinguish word meanings. It has also no influence on the quality or quantity of vowels, i.e. the vowels are not reduced in unstressed syllables and can be both short and long regardless of the stress. Thus, the Czech rhythm can be considered as isosyllabic.

Intonation 

Czech is not a tonal language. Tones or melodies are not lexical distinctive features. However, intonation is a distinctive feature on the level of sentences. Tone can differentiate questions  from simple messages, as it need not necessarily be indicated by the word order:
 ('he did it')
 ('did he do it?')
 ('he did it?!')

All these sentences have the same lexical and grammatical structure. The differences are in their intonation.

Phonotactics 
Open syllables of type CV are the most abundant in Czech texts. It is supposed that all syllables were open in the Proto-Slavic language. Syllables without consonant onset occur with a relatively little frequency. The usage of the glottal stop as an onset in such syllables confirms this tendency in the pronunciation of Bohemian speakers.

The general structure of Czech syllables is:
(C)(C)(C)(C)(C)V(C)(C)(C)

C – consonant
V – vowel or syllabic consonant

Thus, Czech word can have up to five consonants in the initial group (e.g. vzkvět) and three consonants in the final group (not including syllabic consonants). ('wolf'),   ('neck'),   ('eight').

Vowel groups can occur in the morpheme boundaries. They cannot include more than two vowels. Both vowels in the groups are separate syllabic nuclei and do not form diphthongs.

Morphophonology
Phoneme alternations in morphophonemes (changes which do not affect morpheme meaning) are frequently applied in inflections and derivations. They are divided into vowel and consonant alternations. Both types can be combined in a single morpheme:
    ('book')
    ('in a book')
    ('little book')

Vowel alternations 
The most important alternations are those of short and long phonemes. Some of these alternations are correlative, i.e. the phonemes in pairs differ in their length only. Due to historical changes in some phonemes ( → ,  → , similar to the Great Vowel Shift in English), some alternations are disjunctive, i.e. the phonemes in pairs are different in more features. These alternations occur in word roots during inflections and derivations, and they also affect prefixes in derivations.

Some other disjunctive vowel alternations occur in word roots during derivations (rarely also during inflections):
 ||:  ('happy') –  ('happiness');  ('egg') – vajec ('eggs' gen.)
 ||:  ('is carrying') –  ('carries')
 ||:  ('to warm') –  ('to warm up')
 ||:  ('to shake') –  ('tremor')
 ||:  ('to produce') –  ('production')
 ||:  ('doe') –  ('hare')

Emergence/disappearance alternations also take place, i.e. vowels alternate with null phonemes. In some allomorphs,  is inserted between consonants in order to make the pronunciation easier:
 ||:  ('mother') –  ('mothers' gen.);  ('lie') –  ('lies')

It also occurs in some prepositions which have vocalised positional variants:  – ('in a house') –  ('in water');  ('with you') –  ('with me'), etc.

Some other alternations of this type occur, but they are not so frequent:
 ||:  ('to write out') –  ('abstract')
 ||:  ('to reproach once') –  ('to reproach');  ('to take away once') –  ('to take away') (examples of verb pairs with perfective and imperfective aspects)
 ||:  ('dry') –  ('to become dry')

Consonant alternation 
Alternations of hard and soft consonants represent the most abundant type. They occur regularly in word-stem final consonants before certain suffixes (in derivations) and endings (in inflections). These changes also occur before some other suffixes (e.g. ). Softening can be both correlative and disjunctive.

The last five examples are emergence alternations. These alternations are analogical with softening alternations, therefore they are mentioned here. They also occur in word roots together with vowel alternations (usually ||).

Some other alternations occur but they are not so frequent. They are often little evident:
 ||:  –  ('to be drowning' – both words)
 ||:  ('to be turning') –  ('to take a turn')
 ||:  ('to carry') –  ('to dress')

Orthographic notes
In some letter groups, phonological principles of the Czech orthography are broken:

Sample
The sample text is a reading of the first sentence of The North Wind and the Sun by a native speaker of Common Czech, who is from Prague.

Phonemic transcription

Phonetic transcription

Orthographic version
Severák a Slunce se hádali, kdo z nich je silnější.

See also
 Czech alphabet
 Czech declension
 Czech language
 Czech orthography
 Czech verb
 History of the Czech language

References

Bibliography

External links 
 

Czech language
Slavic phonologies